Events from the year 1569 in India.

Events
 October until the end of the year – Chittorgarh Fort Siege of 1567

Births

Deaths
 Ali ibn Abd-al-Malik al-Hindi, Indian Sunni Muslim scholars of Islam

See also

 Timeline of Indian history